Valdobbiadene is a town in the province of Treviso, Veneto, Italy.
Valdobbiadene is a wine growing area.  Just below the Alpine-Dolomite areas of Veneto, it provides a climate for a cool variety of grape (Glera).

The Conegliano Valdobbiadene area is the home of the best Prosecco, an extra dry sparkling white wine. Prosecco brands that derive from this area include  Altaneve, Bisol, Mionetto, Col Vetoraz, Coda, Valdo and others.

On 7 July 2019, Le Colline del Prosecco di Conegliano e Valdobbiadene was inscribed as a UNESCO World Heritage Site.

Gallery

Twin towns
Valdobbiadene is twinned with:

  Mór, Hungary

References

Cities and towns in Veneto
World Heritage Sites in Italy